Arthur George Guillemard (18 December 1845 – 7 August 1909) was an English rugby union fullback who represented for England in the world's first rugby international in 1871. Guillemard was also a notable sporting administrator and one of the most important early international rugby referees.

Rugby career
Arthur George Guillemard was born 18 December 1845 in Lewisham, London. He was a founder member of an early cricket club at Rugby School. Guillemard played club rugby for West Kent, and in 1871 he was selected for the England team as a fullback in the very first international rugby match on 27 March 1871 played against Scotland. He also served as a referee. Guillemard was president of the Rugby Football Union from 1878 to 1882. He died 7 August 1909 aged 63 years in Lewisham.

References

1845 births
1909 deaths
England international rugby union players
English rugby union players
English rugby union referees
Rugby union fullbacks
Rugby union players from Greenwich